Naso tonganus is a tropical fish found in coral reefs in the Pacific and Indian Oceans. It is commonly known as the bulbnose unicornfish, hump-nosed unicornfish, humphead unicornfish, or the humpnose unicorn. It is of value in commercial fisheries.

References

External links
 

Naso (fish)
Fish described in 1835